The Detroit Falcons were a Basketball Association of America (forerunner of the National Basketball Association) team based in Detroit. It played in the inaugural 1946–47 season and folded soon after the season ended, leaving Detroit without a professional basketball team until a decade later, when the Fort Wayne Pistons moved there.

History
The Falcons played only in the inaugural season of the BAA and finished 4th in the Western Division with a 20–40 record,  games out of first place. Stan Miasek was the team's star, scoring 895 points (14.9 points per game) and making the BAA's First-Team that year.

Personnel
Head coaches
 Glenn M. Curtis (12–22)
 Philip Sachs (8–18)

Players
 Bob Dille
 Harold Brown
 Stan Miasek
 George Pearcy
 Henry Pearcy
 Milt Schoon
 Harold Johnson

External links
 Detroit Falcons History NBA Hoops Online
 Basketball-reference team season page

 
Defunct National Basketball Association teams
Basketball Association of America teams
1946 establishments in Michigan
1947 disestablishments in Michigan
Basketball teams established in 1946
Basketball teams disestablished in 1947